Trevor Arthur Holder (born May 8, 1973 in Saint John, New Brunswick, Canada) is a New Brunswick politician.  He is currently a member of the Legislative Assembly of New Brunswick representing the electoral district of Portland-Simonds and a government MLA, additionally he is currently the longest serving member of the legislative assembly, unusual as most of the longest serving members in a legislative body tend to be much older.

A 1995 graduate of the University of New Brunswick in Saint John, he earned a Bachelor of Arts in political science and history.

Politics
A member of the Progressive Conservative Party, Holder first ran for the legislature in the 1995 provincial election losing in Saint John Portland with 33.3% to 38.6% for the victorious Liberal candidate Leo McAdam.  Holder faced McAdam in a re-match in 1999 and won with 59.7% of the vote to McAdam's 26%.

Holder served as a backbencher for his first term and, following re-election in 2003 he became deputy speaker of the legislature.  He was named to cabinet on November 21, 2005 as Minister of Environment and Local Government; he became Minister of Environment on February 14, 2006 when his department was split in two.

Holder was reelected in the 2006 election, in which the Tories were defeated by Shawn Graham's Liberal Party.  While in opposition, he served on several legislative committees, including the standing committees on estimates, private bills and privileges.  He was official Opposition Deputy House leader and official Opposition critic for areas of interest related to post-secondary education, poverty reduction, the Labour and Employment Board, and WorkSafe NB.

Holder was again reelected in the 2010 election, held September 27, 2010.  On October 12, 2010, he was sworn in as Minister of Tourism and Parks and Minister of Wellness, Culture and Sport in the cabinet of Premier David Alward. On March 1, 2012, Holder became Minister of Culture, Tourism and Healthy Living when Alward restructured and combined several departments. The new department was split again on September 26, 2012, and Holder was named Minister of Tourism, Heritage and Culture.

Holder was re-elected in the 2014, 2018, and 2020 provincial elections.

References

External links 
 Official Site

1973 births
Living people
University of New Brunswick alumni
Canadian Anglicans
Progressive Conservative Party of New Brunswick MLAs
Members of the Executive Council of New Brunswick
Politicians from Saint John, New Brunswick
21st-century Canadian politicians